In Meitei mythology and folklore, the epic cycles of incarnations in Moirang is a cyclic epic of seven incarnations (nine in some versions) of two divine lovers in the kingdom of Moirang in the realm of Ancient Kangleipak (early Manipur).

Contents

In popular culture 
In popular culture, the epic cycles of incarnations appear in arts, books, movies, theatres and many others.

 Khambana Kao Phaba (painting) - a 2001 Meitei oil canvas painting, by M Betombi Singh, depicting Khuman Khamba capturing the Kao (bull)
 "Kao, the sacred bull" - a 2011 Meitei language theatrical show, by the Laihui Ensemble, about Khuman Khamba capturing the Kao (bull)
 Phou-oibi, the Rice Goddess - a 2013 Meitei language ballad opera
 "Tonu Laijinglembi" - a 2014 Meitei language drama written by Sarangthem Bormani and directed by B Jugolchandra
 Phouoibi Shayon - a 2017 Meitei language film
 "Tonu Laijinglembi" - a 2018 Meitei language drama, directed by L Bikram of the "Aryan Theatre, Imphal"
 "Tonu Laijinglembi Seitharol" - a 2018 Meitei Mayek edition of the book "Tonu Laijinglembi Seitharol" written by Hijam Guno
 "Kao Faba" - a 2020 Meitei language Shumang Kumhei, performed by Western Cultural Association, about Khuman Khamba capturing the Kao (bull)

See also 
 And That Is Why . . . Manipuri Myths Retold
 List of epics in Meitei language
 Numit Kappa
 The Tales of Kanglei Throne

Notes

References

External links

Deal with the Devil
 
Katabasis
History of Manipur
Indian folklore
Love stories
Marriage and religion
Meitei folklore
Meitei literature
Meitei mythology
Mythological lovers
Recurrent elements in fairy tales
Recurring elements in folklore
Tropes
Witchcraft in folklore and mythology